Caleb Serong (born 9 February 2001) is an Australian rules footballer who plays for the Fremantle Football Club in the Australian Football League (AFL).

Early life
Serong grew up in the Victorian country town of Inverloch before moving to Warragul. From 2013 to 2015 Caleb played for the Warragul Colts JFC he was the U12's best & fairest of 2013 and also helped the U14.5's win the Warragul and District Junior Football League premiership that year. He attended St Paul's Anglican Grammar School and later boarded at Geelong Grammar School on a sports scholarship. He was drafted with the 8th selection in the 2019 AFL draft from Gippsland Power in the NAB League. He made his senior debut for Warragul Football Club at the age of 15. He co-captained the Victoria Country team at the 2019 AFL Under 18 Championships, where he was awarded the team's MVP award and was named in the All-Australian team.

AFL career
Serong was recruited by Fremantle with pick eight in the 2019 AFL draft and made his debut in the fourth round of the 2020 AFL season at Metricon Stadium against Gold Coast.

In Round 8 of the 2020 AFL season Serong was awarded the Rising Star nomination after being one of Fremantle's best players in their 32 point loss to Geelong, and won the award overall at the season's conclusion. A thrilling Western Derby in round 22 of the 2021 AFL season saw Serong win Goal of the Year after kicking a remarkable off-the-canvas banana from an 'impossible angle' deep within Optus Stadium’s south-east pocket.

The 2022 AFL season saw Serong play 22 out of a possible 24 games, missing Fremantle's Round 3 Western Derby due to a sore knee, as well as their clash against GWS the following week. He was arguably best-afield during Fremantle's round 23 clash against GWS at Manuka Oval in Canberra, collecting a game-high 32 possessions, 11 clearances, eight score involvements and kicking a goal. Serong again had a stand out performance the next week during Fremantle's elimination final against the Western Bulldogs at Optus Stadium, racking up 33 disposals, 10 clearances and a goal.

Family

Statistics
Updated to the end of the 2022 season.

|-
| 2020 ||  || 22
| 14 || 2 || 1 || 127 || 109 || 236 || 32 || 58 || 0.1 || 0.1 || 9.1 || 7.8 || 16.9 || 2.3 || 4.1 || 1
|-
| 2021 ||  || 3
| 22 || 8 || 10 || 279 || 224 || 503 || 64 || 72 || 0.4 || 0.5 || 12.7 || 10.2 || 22.9 || 2.9 || 3.3 || 5
|-
| 2022 ||  || 3
| 22 || 5 || 9 || 272 || 309 || 581 || 57 || 96 || 0.2 || 0.4 || 12.4 || 14.0 || 26.4 || 2.6 || 4.4 || 5
|- class=sortbottom
! colspan=3 | Career
! 58 !! 15 !! 20 !! 678 !! 642 !! 1320 !! 153 !! 226 !! 0.3 !! 0.3 !! 11.7 !! 11.1 !! 22.8 !! 2.6 !! 3.9 !! 11
|}

Notes

Honours and achievements
Individual
 AFL Rising Star: 2020
 AFLPA Best First Year Player Award: 2020
 AFLCA Best Young Player Award: 2020
 AFL Goal of the Year: 2021
 Glendinning–Allan Medal: 2021 (round 22)
 22under22 team: 2022

References

External links

2001 births
Living people
Fremantle Football Club players
Australian rules footballers from Victoria (Australia)
Gippsland Power players
People educated at Geelong Grammar School